GT Ultra is the fifth studio album by American indie rock band Guerilla Toss. It was released on May 19, 2017 by DFA Records.

Critical reception

Ultra GT was met with favorable reviews from critics. Reviewing the album for Pitchfork, Jesse Jarnow wrote that the album is "anything but monochromatic, but its energy also feels occasionally constrained by its own parameters, with Carlson’s lyrics and the band's arrangements pogoing at the edge of total freedom, and perhaps total chaos." In the Review for Tiny Mix Tapes, Leah B. Levinson called it "an album that is full of musical ingenuity and aural pleasures" but also felt that it was "lacking in long-term affect or cultural demarcators."

Track listing

Personnel
Credits transcribed from AllMusic.

Musicians
 Kassie Carlson – vocals, writing
 William Dantzler – vocals
 Ari Diacomis – congas
 Ben Katzman - bass
 Sam Lisabeth – keyboard
 Peter Negroponte – drums
 Arian Shafiee – guitar

Production
 Peter Blackbridge - producer
 Dan Death – producer, mixing, tracking
 Joe Lambert – mastering
Design
Artwork - Mark McCloud
Layout - Keith Rankin

References

2017 albums
DFA Records albums